Margus Hernits, before 1991 also credited as Margus Kulkov (born October 2, 1976) is an Estonian former competitive figure skater. An eight-time Estonian national champion, he competed in the 1994 Winter Olympics, the 1998 Winter Olympics and the 2002 Winter Olympics, placing 25th, 20th and 27th respectively. After retiring from competition, he became a technical specialist and vice-president of the Estonian Skating Union.

Programs

Results

References

External links
 

Estonian male single skaters
Olympic figure skaters of Estonia
Figure skaters at the 1998 Winter Olympics
Figure skaters at the 2002 Winter Olympics
International Skating Union technical specialists
Living people
1976 births
Figure skaters from Tallinn
Competitors at the 1997 Winter Universiade
Competitors at the 2001 Winter Universiade